José Geraldo da Costa Moreira Filho (born 21 November 1961) is a former international freestyle swimmer from Brazil, who participated for his native country at the 1988 Summer Olympics in Seoul, South Korea. There, he ended up in 33rd place in the men's 50-metre freestyle event.

References

1961 births
Living people
Brazilian male freestyle swimmers
Olympic swimmers of Brazil
Swimmers at the 1988 Summer Olympics
Universidade Gama Filho alumni
20th-century Brazilian people